WBES (950 AM) is a sports formatted broadcast radio station licensed to Charleston, West Virginia, serving South-Central West Virginia.  WBES is owned and operated by Bristol Broadcasting Company.

References

External links

1957 establishments in West Virginia
Sports radio stations in the United States
Fox Sports Radio stations
Radio stations established in 1957
BES